Choa Kariala railway station (Urdu and ) is located in Choa Kariala village, Gujrat district of Punjab province, Pakistan.

See also
 List of railway stations in Pakistan
 Pakistan Railways

References

External links

Railway stations in Gujrat District
Railway stations on Karachi–Peshawar Line (ML 1)